The 2014 NCAA Rifle Championships were contested at the 35th annual NCAA-sanctioned competition to determine the team and individual national champions of co-ed collegiate rifle shooting in the United States. 

The championships were hosted by Murray State University at the Pat Spurgin Rifle Range and CFSB Center in Murray, Kentucky.

Defending champions West Virginia again won the team championship, the Mountaineers' sixteenth NCAA national title in rifle.

Qualification
With only one national collegiate championship for rifle shooting, all NCAA rifle programs (whether from Division I, Division II, or Division III) were eligible. A total of eight teams contested this championship.

Results
Scoring:  The championship consisted of 60 shots for both smallbore and air rifle per team.

Team title
(DC) = Defending champions
Italics = Inaugural championship
† = Team won center shot tiebreaker

Individual events

References

NCAA Rifle Championship
NCAA Rifle Championships
2014 in shooting sports
NCAA Rifle Championships